Milinda Madugalle is a Sri Lankan film actor and a singer.

Early life and education
Milinda was educated at Nalanda College, Colombo.

Career
In Milinda's most recent film Nalaka Vithanage's Roopantharana he acts with Ravindra Randeniya, Ranjan Ramanayake, Tissa Wijesurendra and Amila Karunanayake.

Movies
"Nim Him" - Film By Mitchell Fonseka
Rupanthana by Nalaka vithanage
Public Domain by Udara Abeysundara
Tele dramas
"A330"  - Tele drama By Chamara Peiris
"Acid" - Tele drama By Chamara Peiris
"VVIP" - Tele drama By Chamara Peiris
"Pitastharaya" - Tele Drama By Thilina Boralessa
"Sidu" - Tele Drama By Thilina Boralessa
Mage Adara Awanadwa - Tele Drama By Supun Rathnayake
Raahu - Teledrama by Chamara Janraj
Ado - Teledrama by Supun Rathnayake 
Short films
"Thrust" Short Film By Dimuthu Liyanage
"Aathal Kadanna Epa" - Short Film By Dimuthu Liyanage
"Bike" - Short Film By Gayan D
Tele films
"720 MINUTES" -  By Chamara Peiris
"THRIMAANA" -  By Chamara Peiris

References 

 

 

 

 

Sinhalese actors
Sri Lankan Buddhists
Alumni of Nalanda College, Colombo
Sri Lankan male film actors
Sri Lankan male television actors
Sinhalese male actors
Living people
Year of birth missing (living people)